Tiantang Peak is the highest mountain in Guangzhou, China, with an altitude of . It lies in the northeast of Guangzhou and 80 km away from the municipal area.

See also
 Mount Jizhen, second highest mountain of Guangzhou.

References

Mountains of Guangdong